Elena Alistar-Romanescu (1 June 1873 – 1955) was a Bessarabian physician and politician who was part of Sfatul Țării from Bessarabia.

She was the aunt of poet Magda Isanos.

Biography 
Alistar was born on 1 June 1873 in Vaisal commune, at the time in Ismail County, Romania (now in Odessa Oblast, Ukraine). According to some historical sources, she was of Bessarabian origin. She was born in a family of priest Vasile Bălan. Her mother was Elisabeta Bălan. She graduated from primary school of Congaz of Cahul County, and then, attended the Chișinău Eparchial School. There she met the young theologian Dumitru Alistar. They married. After a while, her husband became a priest and she followed him. Since 1890, she  worked as a teacher in the such villages as Văleni, Roșu, Zîrnești, Cahul, Rezeni, and Chișinău. After her husband's death, she was encouraged by the journalist Mihai Vântu to leave for Iași, Romania. In 1909–1916, she attended the Medical Faculty of the University of Iași. She was arrested for "nationalistic activity" together with the members of Daniel Ciugureanu's group. The group has claimed the need for forced liberation of Bessarabia from the Russian influence. In 1916, she was recruited by the army as a military doctor. She continued to practice medicine at Costiujeni Hospital near Chișinău.

She was the member of the Moldavian National Party and was elected as an MP from the Cetatea Albă County for the Sfatul Țării. She was one of the two women  elected as MP, and actively took part in the political events that led to Bessarabia's unification with Romania. On 27 March 1918, she voted for the Union of Bessarabia with Romania. The other woman MP, Nadejda Grinfeld, was shot by the Romanian Army for opposing such an unification.

 

Alistar founded the Women's Cultural League of Bessarabia. She was the president of the People's Party, founded by Mareșal Alexandru Averescu, who was also originally from Babele, a commune near Izmail, Budjak which was at the time in the United Principalities of Moldavia and Wallachia and is now in Ukraine. The newspaper "New Romania" was founded and headed by Onisifor Ghibu, in which have been published many articles signed by Elena Alistar. In 1927, she established in Bessarabia the Romanian Women Group. She became famous for her activity for the Romanian Women Orthodox Society which operates under the patronage of Mrs. Alexandrina Cantacuzino. After the Soviet occupation of Bessarabia and Northern Bukovina of 28 June 1940, she fled to Romania. Years later, she was reburied at the Bellu Cemetery in Bucharest.

Works 
 Elena Alistar - Mișcarea feministă din Basarabia. Începuturi și realizări. Spre un viitor mai frumos. In: Mișcarea Feministă. 1. Nr. 1 (1933): 2.

Gallery

Bibliography 
Gheorghe E. Cojocaru, Sfatul Țării: itinerar, Civitas, Chişinău, 1998,  
Mihai Taşcă, Sfatul Țării şi actualele autorităţi locale, "Timpul de dimineaţă", no. 114 (849), June 27, 2008 (page 16)
Alexandru Chiriac. Membrii Sfatului Ţării. 1917–1918. Dicţionar, Editura Fundaţiei Culturale Române, București, 2001.

External links  
 Unica femeie deputat din Sfatul Ţării. Elena ALISTAR, un exemplu de conştiinţă politică 
 Elena Alistar
 Nataşa PETEU: Unica femeie deputat din Sfatul Ţării: Elena ALISTAR, un exemplu de conştiinţă politică 
 Arhiva pentru Sfatul Tarii 
 Deputaţii Sfatului Ţării şi Lavrenti Beria

References 

Romanian people of Moldovan descent
1873 births
1955 deaths
People from Odesa Oblast
National Moldavian Party politicians
Moldovan MPs 1917–1918
Moldovan physicians
Burials at Bellu Cemetery
Moldovan female MPs
20th-century Romanian women politicians
Grigore T. Popa University of Medicine and Pharmacy alumni
Prisoners and detainees of Romania
19th-century Romanian women